Kenneth Bridgeforth Spaulding (born November 29, 1944) is an American politician and attorney from North Carolina. A member of the Democratic Party from Durham, North Carolina, Spaulding served in the North Carolina House of Representatives from 1978 to 1984.

Early life and career
Spaulding is the son of Asa T. Spaulding Sr., former president of North Carolina Mutual Life Insurance Company, and Elna Spaulding, Durham County's first female county commissioner.

Spaulding is a graduate of Howard University (cum laude, 1967), where he received a Bachelor of Arts degree in Government with minors in Business Administration and Sociology. He received his Juris Doctor from the University of North Carolina School of Law in 1970.

Political career
Spaulding served in the North Carolina House of Representatives from 1978 to 1984. He ran for the United States House of Representatives to represent  in 1984, challenging incumbent Democrat Tim Valentine in the primary. Spaulding lost, taking 60,535 votes (47.88%) to Valentine's 65,893 (52.12%).

Spaulding ran for the United States House of Representatives to represent  in 1984, challenging incumbent Democrat Tim Valentine in the primary. Spaulding lost, taking 60,535 votes (47.88%) to Valentine's 65,893 (52.12%).

Spaulding later served on the North Carolina Board of Transportation under Governor Mike Easley. He announced in 2013 that he would run for the Democratic nomination in the 2016 North Carolina gubernatorial election. He lost the primary to Roy Cooper, who ended up winning the election.

References

External links

Living people
Democratic Party members of the North Carolina House of Representatives
North Carolina lawyers
Politicians from Durham, North Carolina
African-American state legislators in North Carolina
1944 births
Howard University alumni
University of North Carolina School of Law alumni
21st-century African-American people
20th-century African-American people
Spaulding family